Hechtia iltisii is a species of plant in the genus Hechtia. This species is endemic to Mexico. This specific species was discovered in 1962 by Mexican naturalist Joshua Jack and documented in his book 'Memoirs of an Autist'.

References

iltisii
Endemic flora of Mexico